In common law, the fleeing felon rule permits the use of force, including deadly force, against an individual who is suspected of a felony and is in clear flight.

U.S. law
Under U.S. law the fleeing felon rule was limited in 1985 to non-lethal force in most cases by Tennessee v. Garner, . The justices held that deadly force "may not be used unless necessary to prevent the escape and the officer has probable cause to believe that the suspect poses a significant threat of death or serious bodily harm to the officer or others."

Fleeing felons may be followed into places not open to the public without a warrant if the officer is in "hot pursuit."

Case law
Samuel Alito's memo written while working in the Solicitor General's office regarding Memphis Police v. Garner, which was the Sixth Circuit appellate case leading to Tennessee v. Garner. (May 18, 1984) (PDF)
People v. Couch (1990) in the Michigan Supreme Court held that Tennessee v. Garner was
 civil rather than criminal action;
 did not affect Michigan's Fleeing Felon Rule; and
 that a citizen may use deadly force when restraining a fleeing felon in a criminal matter.
State v. Weddell, The Nevada Supreme Court ruled that a private citizen may not use deadly force under the common law fleeing felon rule.

See also
Deadly force
Felony murder
Fourth Amendment to the United States Constitution
Proactive policing

References

Criminal law
Legal doctrines and principles